Leninsk-Kuznetsky (masculine), Leninsk-Kuznetskaya (feminine), or Leninsk-Kuznetskoye (neuter) may refer to:
Leninsk-Kuznetsky (city), a city in Kemerovo Oblast, Russia
Leninsk-Kuznetsky Urban Okrug, a municipal formation which that city is incorporated as
Leninsk-Kuznetsky District, a district of Kemerovo Oblast, Russia

See also
 Leninsk (disambiguation)
 Kuznetsky (disambiguation)
 FC Zarya Leninsk-Kuznetsky